Alpha 4 may refer to:

Alpha 4 (Power Rangers), fictional character from the Power Rangers series
Alpha 4 (Robert Silverberg anthology), collection of short stories